Kohdaibari is a small town in the Nandurbar district in Nashik division of Kandesh region of Maharashtra state in India. It is located on National Highway 6 running between Hazira (near Surat) in Gujarat to Kolkata, West Bengal.

References 

Cities and towns in Nandurbar district